Beaver Creek is an  tributary of Swatara Creek in Dauphin County, Pennsylvania, in the United States.

Beaver Creek joins the Swatara Creek near the borough of Hummelstown.

Tributaries
Nyes Run

See also
List of rivers of Pennsylvania

References

Rivers of Dauphin County, Pennsylvania
Rivers of Pennsylvania
Tributaries of Swatara Creek